is a Japanese manga author. Yazawa's most famous manga include Tenshi Nanka Ja Nai, Neighborhood Story, Paradise Kiss, and especially Nana, the latter being one of the best-selling manga series.

Career
While most of Yazawa's manga is published in Japan by Shueisha, publishers of Ribon and Cookie (Nana was serialized in the latter), series like Paradise Kiss have appeared in non-Shueisha magazines such as Zipper, published by Shodensha.

She also voiced an animated rendition of herself that made a cameo appearance in the final episode of the Neighborhood Story anime. All five volumes of Paradise Kiss were released in English by Vertical, Inc. Nana ran in now-defunct American manga magazine Shojo Beat. In 2003, Yazawa was awarded the Shogakukan Manga Award for Nana. Nana was made into an anime (produced by Madhouse) and a successful movie with a sequel in Japan.

In June 2009, it was revealed that Yazawa had contracted a sudden illness, and had to be sent to the hospital for treatment, putting Nana on hiatus. She returned from the hospital in April 2010, although it has yet to be revealed when or if she will be continuing Nana.

Yazawa has worked on a variety of small illustrative projects since putting Nana on hold. She provided artwork for singer JUJU's single Iiwake in 2017 and a celebratory illustration for Space Channel 5 VR in 2020, drew a mini-manga featuring characters from her series Tenshi Nanka Ja Nai and Neighborhood Story in 2016, contributed new images to the 2015 Nana calendar, and published a new "Junko's Room" chapter, her first new manga in over three years, in 2013.

Style 
Yazawa's storylines are generally centered on young women and their relationships. The characters are always very stylish, and she is known especially for her hip sense of fashion. Yazawa herself attended a fashion school after high school but did not complete her studies there. Another key point is her often rebellious characters, who tend to be juxtaposed against the more traditional ones.

She been compared to fellow manga artist Taku Tsumugi for her play with depth and layering.

Works
 Ano Natsu (1985) 
 15-nenme (1986)
 Love Letter (1987)
 Kaze ni Nare! (1988)
 Escape (1988)
 Ballad Made Soba ni Ite (1989) – 2 volumes
 Marine Blue no Kaze ni Dakarete (1990–1991) – 4 volumes
 Usubeni no Arashi (1992)
 Tenshi Nanka Ja Nai (1992–1995) – 8 volumes
 Neighborhood Story (1995–1998) – 7 volumes
 Kagen no Tsuki (1998–1999) – 3 volumes
 Paradise Kiss (2000–2004) – 5 volumes published by Shodensha
 Nana (2000–2009) – 21 volumes (hiatus)
 Princess Ai (2004–2005) – 3 volumes

References

External links

 
 
 Profile  at The Ultimate Manga Guide 

 
1967 births
Female comics writers
Japanese female comics artists
People from Amagasaki
Living people
Women manga artists
Manga artists from Hyōgo Prefecture
20th-century Japanese writers
20th-century Japanese women writers
21st-century Japanese writers
21st-century Japanese women writers